The State Saṅgha Mahā Nāyaka Committee (abbreviated Mahana or  in Burmese, SSMNC in English) is a government-appointed body of high-ranking Buddhist monks that oversees and regulates the Sangha (Buddhist clergy) in Burma (Myanmar).

History
The Committee was formed after the First Congregation of All Orders for the Purification, Perpetuation and Propagation of Sasana, which sought to consolidate state control of the country's Sangha, was held in Rangoon (now Yangon) from 24 to 27 May 1980. The Congregation developed a hierarchy to regulate monks at the village tract/ward, state/division and national levels via committees and devised a central governing body of 33 members now called the state Sangha Maha Nayaka Committee, which would be responsible for all Buddhist monks in the country. The Committee also developed regulations to force monks to register and receive separate identification cards.

Membership
The Committee now consists of 47 members, including a chairperson, six vice-chairpersons, one secretary general, six joint general secretaries and 33 other members, all of whom are appointed by the Burmese Ministry of Religious Affairs. Until 1995, appointment terms lasted 5 years. Since 1995, the government has cut term lengths, with a quarter of seats changed every 3 years.

Controversies
In theory, the Committee oversees violations of the Vinaya, the traditional regulatory framework of Theravada Buddhist monks.  This body has been used by the government to curtail monks' involvement in non-religious affairs. The Committee has the power to disrobe monks who have violated its decrees and edicts as well as Vinaya regulations and laws, and expel monks from their resident monasteries.

During the Saffron Revolution in 2007, the Committee announced new regulations to prohibit monks from participating in secular affairs.

In December 2009, the Committee banned advertisements of Dhamma talks and lectures held by monks, including posters.

In February 2012, Shwenyawa Sayadaw, the abbot of the Sadhu Pariyatti Monastery, was evicted from his monastery by the Committee for alleged disobedience, by holding a sermon at the Mandalay office of the National League for Democracy in September, where he had publicly called for the release of political prisoners and the end of ongoing civil wars, despite sending the Committee an apology where he had asked for a repeal. In December 2011, he had met with Hillary Clinton, US Secretary of State, along with other civil society delegates.

In February 2012, U Gambira, a prominent monk in the Saffron Revolution was accused by the Committee for committing the offences of illegal squatting and breaking and entering of monasteries, and subsequently arrested by secular authorities.

In March 2021, the Committee issued a draft statement calling on the State Administration Council (SAC) to end violence against protesters opposing the 2021 military takeover, itself vowing to halt its administrative activities in solidarity. On March 14, it was reported that Bhaddanta Kumārabhivaṁsa, the committee's head, had consequently been detained.

References

External links
Official website

Buddhist organisations based in Myanmar
Government agencies of Myanmar
1980 establishments in Burma
Government agencies established in 1980